Aliabad-e Sofla may refer to the following places in Iran:

Aliabad-e Sofla, East Azerbaijan
Aliabad-e Sofla, Marvdasht, Fars Province
Aliabad-e Sofla, Ilam
Aliabad-e Sofla, Rudbar-e Jonubi, Kerman Province
Aliabad-e Sofla, Zarand, Kerman Province
Aliabad-e Sofla, Kermanshah
Aliabad-e Sofla, Kangavar, Kermanshah Province
Aliabad-e Sofla, Khuzestan
Aliabad-e Sofla, Lorestan
Aliabad-e Sofla, Razavi Khorasan
Aliabad-e Sofla, South Khorasan

See also
Aliabad-e Pain (disambiguation)